is a city located in Ibaraki Prefecture, Japan. , the city had an estimated population of 244,528 in 108,669 households and a population density of 862 persons per km². The percentage of the population aged over 65 was 20.3%.

Geography
Tsukuba is located in southern Ibaraki Prefecture, approximately 50 kilometers from central Tokyo and about 40 kilometers from Narita International Airport. Mount Tsukuba, from which the city takes its name is located in the northern part of the city. Except for the area around Mount Tsukuba, the city is a part of the Kantō Plain with an altitude of 20 to 30 meters.

Mountains: Mount Tsukuba, Mount Hokyo.

Rivers: Kokai River, Sakura River, Higashiyata River, Nishiyata River, Ono River, Hanamuro River, Inari River.

Parks: The city has more of 100  parks and green areas to relax. Different parks are connected by pedestrian walk and bikeways, some parks has equipped with tennis courts and round pavements for jogging and walking. Doho Park, is a park surrounded by vegetation centered in Doho Swamp, has a baseball field, a soccer field, a gym and a heated indoor pool equipped with solar heating system. Matsumi Park, has a 45m height of observation tour and a Japanese style garden with flowers and a small pond.

Gardens: Tsukuba Botanical Garden and Tsukuba Peony Garden.

In the extreme south is the Ushiku Lagoon; the Nishiyata, Higashiyata and Inari rivers discharge their waters into it. The Ushiku Lagoon through the Yata River, flows into the Kokai River.

At the end of their courses, the Kokai River discharge into the Tone River, and the Sakura, Hanamuro and Ono rivers discharge into the Lake Kasumigaura.

Surrounding municipalities
Ibaraki Prefecture
 Tsukubamirai
 Jōsō
 Shimotsuma
 Chikusei
 Sakuragawa
 Ishioka
 Tsuchiura
 Ushiku
 Ryūgasaki

Climate
Tsukuba has a Humid continental climate (Köppen Cfa) characterized by warm summers and cool winters with light snowfall.

Demographics
Per Japanese census data, the population of Tsukuba has increased rapidly since 1980.

History
Mount Tsukuba has been a place of pilgrimage since at least the Heian period. During the Edo period, parts of what later became the city of Tsukuba were administered by a junior branch of the Hosokawa clan at Yatabe Domain, one of the feudal domains of the Tokugawa shogunate. With the creation of the modern municipalities system after the Meiji Restoration on April 1, 1889, the town Yatabe was established within Tsukuba District, Ibaraki.

Beginning in the 1960s, the area was designated for development. Construction of the city centre, the University of Tsukuba and 46 public basic scientific research laboratories began in the 1970s. Tsukuba Science City became operational in the 1980s. The Expo '85 world's fair was held in the area of Tsukuba Science City, which at the time was still divided administratively between several small towns and villages. Attractions at the event included the  Technocosmos, which at that time was the world's tallest Ferris wheel.

On November 30, 1987 the town of Yatabe merged with the neighboring towns of Ōho and Toyosato (from Tsukuba District)) and the village of Sakura (from Niihari District) to create the city of Tsukuba. The neighboring town of Tsukuba merged with the city of Tsukuba on January 1, 1988. Followed by the town of Kukizaki (from Inashiki District) on November 1, 2002. Therefore, Yatabe, Ōho, Toyosato, Sakura, Tsukuba and Kukizaki, correspond to the ancient towns and villages.

By 2000, the city's 60 national research institutes and two national universities had been grouped into five zones: higher education and training, construction research, physical science and engineering research, biological and agricultural research, and common (public) facilities. These zones were surrounded by more than 240 private research facilities. Among the most prominent institutions are the University of Tsukuba (1973; formerly Tokyo University of Education); the High Energy Accelerator Research Organization (KEK); the National Institute of Advanced Industrial Science and Technology; the Electrotechnical Laboratory; the Mechanical Engineering Laboratory; and the National Institute for Materials Science. The city has an international flair, with about 7,500 foreign students and researchers from as many as 133 countries living in Tsukuba at any one time.

Over the past several decades, nearly half of Japan's public research and development budget has been spent in Tsukuba. Important scientific breakthroughs by its researchers include the identification and specification of the molecular structure of superconducting materials, the development of organic optical films that alter their electrical conductivity in response to changing light, and the creation of extreme low-pressure vacuum chambers. Tsukuba has become one of the world's key sites for government-industry collaborations in basic research. Earthquake safety, environmental degradation, studies of roadways, fermentation science, microbiology, and plant genetics are some of the broad research topics having close public-private partnerships.

On April 1, 2007 Tsukuba was designated a Special city with increased autonomy.

Following the Fukushima I nuclear accidents in 2011, evacuees from the accident zone reported that municipal officials in Tsukuba refused to allow them access to shelters in the city unless they presented certificates from the Fukushima government declaring that the evacuees were "radiation free".

On May 6, 2012, Tsukuba was struck by a tornado that caused heavy damage to numerous structures and left approximately 20,000 residents without electricity. The storm killed one 14-year-old boy and injured 45 people. The tornado was rated an F-3 by the Japan Meteorological Agency, making it the most powerful tornado to ever hit Japan. Some spots had F-4 damage.

Government
Tsukuba has a mayor-council form of government with a directly elected mayor and a unicameral city council of 28 members. Tsukuba contributes five members to the Ibaraki Prefectural Assembly. In terms of national politics, the city is part of Ibaraki 6th district of the lower house of the Diet of Japan.

Economy
The local economy was traditionally based on rice production, and Tsukuba still has the largest area under paddy fields in Ibaraki Prefecture. After the establishment of Tsukuba Science City, the numerous government and private research institutes has drawn a large number of factories and supporting businesses.

Companies headquartered in Tsukuba
Intel Japan (1980-2016)
Cyberdyne Inc.
SoftEther Corporation

Manufacturing
Komori Corporation has its main manufacturing plant in Tsukuba.

Education

Higher education
University of Tsukuba, Tsukuba Campus
National University Corporation Tsukuba University of Technology
Graduate University for Advanced Studies, Tsukuba Campus
Tsukuba Gakuin University

Primary and secondary education
Tsukuba has 29 public elementary schools and 12 public middle schools operated by the city government, and four public high school operated by the Ibaraki Prefectural Board of Education. The prefecture also operates one combined middle school/high school and one special education school for the handicapped. There is also one private combined middle/high school.

In addition, it has international schools, like Tsukuba International School and Liberty International School, and also has a Brazilian school, the Instituto Educare (former Escola Pingo de Gente).

Transportation

Railway
 Metropolitan Intercity Railway Company – Tsukuba Express
Stations in Tsukuba:  -  -  - 

 Tsukuba Kankō Railway
Mount Tsukuba Cable Car

Mount Tsukuba Ropeway

Highway
  – Yatabe Interchange, Tsukuba Junction, Yatabe-Higashi Parking Area, Sakura-Tsuchiura Interchange
  – Tsukuba-Chuo Interchange, Tsukuba Junction, Tsukuba-Ushiku Interchange
 
 
 
 
  – (Ken-Ō Expressway, is signed as National Route 468 as well as C4.)

Media
Tsukuba Community Broadcast Inc. – Radio Tsukuba
Academic Newtown Community Cable Service (ACCS)

Local attractions

Tsukuba Science City
Tsukuba Science City is a center for research and education in the city of Tsukuba, located northeast of Tokyo. The idea of constructing the science city was by the late Ichiro Kono, former minister of construction, and Kuniomi Umezawa, former vice minister of the science and technology agency. Another key figure for the development of the Science City is Leo Esaki. What sets Tsukuba apart from other town developments in Japan is the large scale and fast pace of its development into a place with high quality of scientific innovation.

History 
In September 1963, the national government of Japan, led by Ichiro Kono and Kniomi Umezawa, ordered the development of a science city in the area around the mountain Tsukuba. Reasons behind this decision included the overcrowding in Tokyo, the overflow of applicants to Japanese elite universities, a desire of conservative politicians to decrease the influence of liberal teachers and students, and a need to catch up with the West in terms of scientific knowledge. Furthermore, it was already clear that there was a demand for new research facilities and a fresh approach to university education. This fresh approach was prevalent in the United States; therefore, Japan's Ministry of Education decided to transfer a part of the Tokyo University of Education to the Tsukuba area. The campus of the university was modeled after the University of California, San Diego, campus. After a new university structure was introduced; the power of teachers decreased and the power of administrative management increased. Furthermore, the new structure led to better research facilities, a separate independent research department and the implementation of a board for general policies and regulations.

In 1966, after a few years of intensive study, the government started the project by buying land in the Tsukuba area. The acquiring of land to build on was done by negotiation over prices between the government and landowners. The parcels of land with the most suitable price were purchased. This is reason for the odd shape of the government-owned land in Tsukuba; it is 18 kilometers long from north to east and 6 kilometers wide from east to west. Due to this shape walking is not common in the city.

The building of facilities started in June 1969. The initial building plan was ten years, but in 1980 it became clear that that would not be the case. However, in March 1980 all the facilities that were meant to be built were up and running to a certain extent.

Between 1970 and 1980 researchers and their families started to move to Tsukuba. This move was a culture shock for the families from Tokyo due to the dirt roads and open fields in Tsukuba.

Initially, Tsukuba was built for travel by car due to having no train station. It was actually Japan's first city that promoted automobile travel over public transport. In 2005, a train station was built in the city. The Tsukuba Express travels from Tokyo to the Science City in 45 minutes.

Tsukuba Expo 1985

In order to promote the positive aspects of science and technology, an International Science and Technology Exposition was held. This was a landmark for the science city. The reasons behind the expo were to establish a positive national image of Tsukuba Science City and to gain international recognition that Tsukuba was a place of science. The Expo attracted around 20 million Japanese and foreign visitors.

Leo Esaki 
Leo Esaki  became the president of the University of Tsukuba in 1992. His presidency marked a new era of reform for the Tsukuba Science City. Leo Esaki is a Nobel prize winner and worked at IBM prior to becoming president of the University of Tsukuba. Unlike other Japanese university presidents he had no academic background and no former ties with the University of Tsukuba. This was part of the reason why he was chosen as president. Due to his history in the corporate world, he was able to create a climate were companies and graduate students could work together closely. When the university was founded a good relationship between the students of the university and the nearby companies was expected. However, over the years this ambition disappeared into the background. In these years there was a severe lack in interaction between the facilities of the University and the private companies in the area. This meant that there was no joint research happening. In July 1994, Esaki introduced Tsukuba Advanced Research Alliance (TARA). This is a partnership between the university, foreign researchers, Tsukuba's national research labs, and corporate laboratories based in the city.

Criticism 
From the start there has been a lot of criticism on Tsukuba Science City. The first criticism on the city was that it was not habitable. Wives of the first researchers were used to putting garbage on the side of the road in order for it to get picked up. However, this was not the case in the mid-1970s. Until that time only farmers had lived there and they would process their own garbage into mulch. Because the garbage did not get picked up, it started smelling in the streets. This enraged the housewives and they demanded a garbage service. In order to meet the demand, a pit was dug where the waste could be dumped until a garbage service would be developed in the city. It is important to note that in the nineties Tsukuba had the most innovative garbage system of Japan.

Another criticism levied by national government critics is that Tsukuba Science City is a waste of taxpayer's money. They also believe that Tsukuba is an example of government control of academic and research organization. In addition, social critics feel that Tsukuba's social organization is unfavorable as it lacks traditional Japanese culture.

In Garner the city is described as being ‘flat’ due to a lack of city life.  Even though Tsukuba Science City has an impressive number of research and development facilities as well as a large number of companies it still is not able to reach the same level of innovation as science cities that do have stimulating city life. However, this might be changing because in 2006 Tsukuba Science City started focusing on creating more city life.

Museums
Science Museum of Map and Survey
Tsukuba Expo Center – Planetarium
JAXA Tsukuba Space Center
KEK Exhibition Hall
Tsukuba Botanical Garden
Geological Museum
Cyberdyne Studio - Robotic technologies

Other attractions
Mount Tsukuba
Tsukubasan Shrine
Hirasawa Kanga ruins archaeological site (National Historic Site)
Site of Oda Castle (National Historic Site)
Kanamura Wake Ikazuchi Shrine

Sister city relations
 - Irvine, California, United States, since 1989
 - Milpitas, California, United States, since 1996
 - Cambridge, Massachusetts, United States, since 1984
 - Grenoble, France, since 2013
 - Bochum, Germany, since 2019
 Shenzhen, China (friendship city)

Noted people from Tsukuba

Leo Esaki, Nobel Prize winner 
Susumu Hirasawa, progressive-electronic musician has a studio in Tsukuba
Mitsuhiro Ishida, mixed martial artist
Yasuaki Kurata, actor
Hideki Shirakawa, Nobel Prize winner 
Haruka Sunada, volleyball player
Minanogawa Tōzō, sumo wrestler
Hiroki Yamada, baseball player
Hitoshi Igarashi, literary scholar and translator

See also
 List of technology centers
 List of research parks

References

External links

Official website 

 
Cities in Ibaraki Prefecture
Planned cities in Japan
Populated places established in 1889
1889 establishments in Japan